Afrodacarellus is a genus of mites in the family Rhodacaridae. There are at least 30 described species in Afrodacarellus.

Species
These 30 species belong to the genus Afrodacarellus:

 Afrodacarellus bakeri (Hurlbutt, 1974)
 Afrodacarellus bipilosus (Karg, 1979)
 Afrodacarellus camaxiloensis (Loots, 1969)
 Afrodacarellus citri (Loots, 1969)
 Afrodacarellus concavus Hurlbutt, 1974
 Afrodacarellus euungulae (Karg, 2003)
 Afrodacarellus femoratus Hurlbutt, 1974
 Afrodacarellus filofissus (Karg & Schorlemmer, 2009)
 Afrodacarellus furculatus (Karg, 1979)
 Afrodacarellus kivuensis (Ryke & Loots, 1966)
 Afrodacarellus leleupi (Ryke & Loots, 1966)
 Afrodacarellus longipodus Hurlbutt, 1974
 Afrodacarellus lubalensis (Loots, 1969)
 Afrodacarellus lunguensis (Ryke & Loots, 1966)
 Afrodacarellus lupangaensis Hurlbutt, 1974
 Afrodacarellus machadoi (Loots, 1969)
 Afrodacarellus minutus Hurlbutt, 1974
 Afrodacarellus mongii (Hurlbutt, 1974)
 Afrodacarellus mossi Hurlbutt, 1974
 Afrodacarellus msituni Hurlbutt, 1974
 Afrodacarellus myersi (Loots, 1969)
 Afrodacarellus ngorongoroensis Hurlbutt, 1974
 Afrodacarellus novembus Hurlbutt, 1974
 Afrodacarellus pili Hurlbutt, 1974
 Afrodacarellus pocsi Hurlbutt, 1974
 Afrodacarellus reticulatus (Loots, 1969)
 Afrodacarellus ruwenzoriensis (Loots, 1969)
 Afrodacarellus squamosus (Karg, 1977)
 Afrodacarellus succinctus (Berlese, 1916)
 Afrodacarellus unospinae (Karg, 2003)

References

Rhodacaridae